The 2021 Barcelona FIA Formula 3 round was a motor racing event held on 8 and 9 May 2021 at the Circuit de Barcelona-Catalunya in Montmeló, Catalonia, Spain. It was the first round of the 2021 FIA Formula 3 Championship, and ran in support of the 2021 Spanish Grand Prix.

Classification

Qualifying 
The Qualifying session took place on 7 May 2021, with Dennis Hauger scoring his first FIA F3 pole position, six thousandth ahead of fellow Red Bull junior Jack Doohan.

Sprint Race 1 
On the formation lap the Carlin of Ido Cohen stopped, leading to the start being aborted and one race lap being removed. Cohen was able to start from the pitlane.

Edgar had a good start as Smolyar immediately came under pressure from Caio Collet. The Russian managed to shake off the MP Motorsport driver, who was then drawn into a battle with Novalak and Logan Sargeant, and closed the gap to Edgar.

As soon as DRS was enabled, Smolyar was on the attack, sweeping past the Carlin driver to take the race lead on lap 4. Edgar tried to fight back a lap later but he couldn't get back through. Smolyar managed to break the tow to Edgar and extended a gap at the front of the field.

Edgar was soon joined by Collet, who tried to challenge Edgar for second, but allowed Trident driver Novalak to sweep through to take third after running wide.

Novalak soon snatched second from Edgar around the outside of the first corner and was closing the gap to Smolyar when the safety car was brought out with two laps remaining, after Oliver Rasmussen clipped the curb and ran into the gravel at the final corner, where he got stuck. Rasmussen's car couldn't be cleared in time for a restart and the race ended behind the safety car, allowing Smolyar to take his maiden F3 win. Collet held off Sargeant to take third, and Edgar dropped back to fifth. The battling Caldwell, Vesti and Hauger finished behind, and Martins and Nannini completed the top ten.

Sprint Race 2 
Fittipaldi led from reversed-grid pole position at the start, as the Safety Car was brought out after Smolyar had sustained a puncture in Turn 1 after contact with Novalak, which sent the Russian into the path of Sargeant. After the restart David Schumacher was able to keep up with the Brazilian, and passed him on lap 12.

Schumacher couldn't pull away however and was forced to defend three laps later, when Fittipaldi got fully alongside. Trying to go around the outside of Turn 1, Fittipaldi went wide off track and then tried to rejoin over the raised kerb at Turn 2, banging wheels with Schumacher and sending the latter crashing into the barriers. Fittipaldi continued in third behind Matteo Nannini and Dennis Hauger, only to then slow to a halt under the subsequent safety car period.

When the race restarted with five laps to go, Hauger immediately went side by side with Nannini for the lead, but the HWA driver braked late on the inside to stay out front. Going onto the penultimate lap they were then side-by-side once more, Hauger this time taking to the inside. After mounting the apex kerb he had an oversteer which led to him hitting Nannini, and was left with nowhere to go but run into his spinning rival. This led to Caldwell picking up the lead, and going into the first corner on the last lap he was forced to defend against a charging Victor Martins, leaving the Frenchman no room to go around the outside. The Prema driver won the race and picked up 15 points, ahead of Martins and a quiet Frederik Vesti. Novalak, Collet, Edgar, Iwasa, Doohan, Crawford and Juan Manuel Correa completed the top ten, with the latter scoring the first point of his racing return.

Notes
  – Arthur Leclerc was given a 10-second time penalty for violation of minimum delta time under Safety Car
  – Dennis Hauger was given a 10-second time penalty for causing a collision with Matteo Nannini

Feature Race 
At the start, Hauger didn't have a great launch but as he went four-wide down the long main pit straight with Doohan, Martins and Nannini, he braked last and got ahead of the others, in which Doohan lost out and fell back to fourth.

As Hauger gradually extended the gap at the front, Doohan regained momentum and passed Martins on lap nine, who had run over the sausage kerb at the exit of turn 15, and was then passed by Nannini.

Doohan then overtook Nannini for second after three further laps, as Hauger was able to pull a gap on the rest of the field. Four laps from the end, Caldwell overtook Martins for fourth, and as the gaps remained stagnant for the remainder of the race, Hauger won in dominant fashion. Doohan scored his first F3 podium, with Nannini in third. The three were followed up by Caldwell, Martins, Novalak, Vesti, Collet, Sargeant, who lost two positions on lap 21 after running wide at the final corner, and Staněk, who came home in tenth.

Notes
  – Rafael Villagómez received a five-second time penalty for forcing Amaury Cordeel off the track in the first two corners.

Standings after the event 

Drivers' Championship standings

Teams' Championship standings

 Note: Only the top five positions are included for both sets of standings.

See also 

 2021 Spanish Grand Prix

References

External links 
 Official website

|- style="text-align:center"
|width="35%"|Previous race:
|width="30%"|FIA Formula 3 Championship2021 season
|width="40%"|Next race:

Circuit de Barcelona-Catalunya
Barcelona Formula 3
Barcelona Formula 3 round